The Women's 5K race at the 2006 FINA World Open Water Swimming Championships was swum on Tuesday, August 29, 2006 in Naples, Italy. It was the first event of the 2006 Open Water Worlds, and one of two events on August 29 (the other being the men's 5K race). 27 women swam the event.

Results
All times in hour : minutes : seconds

See also
2004 FINA World Open Water Swimming Championships – Women's 5K
Open water swimming at the 2007 World Aquatics Championships – Women's 5 km
2008 FINA World Open Water Swimming Championships – Women's 5K

References

2006 Open Water Worlds results: Women's 5K from OmegaTiming.com (official timer for the event). Published 2006-08-29; retrieved 2010-01-31.

Fina World Open Water Swimming Championships - Women's 5k, 2006
World Open Water Swimming Championships